Euclimaciopsis is a genus of moths of the Zygaenidae family.

Species
 Euclimaciopsis tortricalis (Druce, 1885)

References
 Euclimaciopsis  at Markku Savela's Lepidoptera and Some Other Life Forms

Procridinae
Zygaenidae genera